This article show all participating team squads at the 2006 FIVB Women's Volleyball World Grand Prix, played by twelve countries from August 16 to September 10, 2006 with the final round held in Reggio Calabria, Italy.

Head Coach: Faig Garayg

Head Coach: José Roberto Guimarães

Head Coach: Chen Zhonghe

Head Coach: Luis Felipe Calderón

Head Coach: Beato Miguel Cruz

Head Coach: Marco Bonitta

Head Coach: Shoichi Yanagimoto

Head coach: Kim Hyung-sil

Head Coach: Andrzej Niemczyk

Head Coach: Giovanni Caprara

Head Coach: Sutchai Chanbunchee

Head Coach: Lang Ping

References
FIVB Line-ups

2006
2006 in volleyball